Stupid Love may refer to:

 Stupid Love (album), a 2009 album by Mindy Smith
 "Stupid Love" (Jason Derulo song), 2014
 "Stupid Love" (Lady Gaga song), 2020	
 "Stupid Love", a song by Dan + Shay from Dan + Shay
 "Stupid Love", a song by Olamide from YBNL
 "Stupid Love", a 2012 song by Supernova
 "S2pid Luv", a 2002 song by Salbakuta
 "Gold (Stupid Love)", a song by Excision and Illenium